Solza is a comune (municipality) in the Province of Bergamo in the Italian region of Lombardy, located about  northeast of Milan and about  west of Bergamo.  

Solza borders the following municipalities: Calusco d'Adda, Medolago. It is the birthplace of medieval condottiero Bartolomeo Colleoni.

References